The PolyMet Mining Corporation, is based in Minnesota, United States with corporate headquarters in Toronto, Canada. It controls rights to the NorthMet Deposit in the Mesabi Range.

In 2011, PolyMet secured a four million dollar loan from the Iron Range Resources and Rehabilitation Board.

See also
PolyMet mine

References

External links
 

Companies listed on the Toronto Stock Exchange
Companies listed on NYSE American
Mining companies of the United States
Companies based in Minnesota